Helix albescens is a species of gastropods belonging to the family Helicidae.

The species is found in near Black Sea.

References

Helicidae
Gastropods described in 1839